Festuca rubra is a species of grass known by the common name red fescue, creeping red fescue or the rush-leaf fescue. It is widespread across much of the Northern Hemisphere and can tolerate many habitats and climates. It is best adapted to well-drained soils in cool, temperate climates; it prefers shadier areas and is often planted for its shade tolerance. Wild animals browse it, but it has not been important for domestic forage due to low productivity and palatability. It is also an ornamental plant for gardens.

Description
Festuca rubra is perennial and has sub-species that have rhizomes and/or form bunchgrass tufts. It mainly exists in neutral and acidic soils. It can grow between 2 and 20 cm tall.

Like all fescues, the leaves are narrow and needle like, making it less palatable to livestock. The swards that it forms are not as tufted as sheep's fescue (Festuca ovina) or wavy hair grass (Deschampsia flexuosa).  The tufted nature is what gives the grass its springy characteristic.  The leaves are bright green.

There are 4 to 10 spikelet flowers, which are up to 15 mm long.

The ligule is very short and blunt.

Cultivation
Festuca rubra, as red fescue or creeping red fescue, is cultivated as an ornamental plant for use as a turfgrass and groundcover. It can be left completely unmowed, or occasionally trimmed for a lush meadow-like look. There are many subspecies, and many cultivars have been bred for the horticulture trade.

See also
Native grasses of California

References

External links
Festuca Rubra, detailed ecology at the Fire Effects Information System, US Forest Service

Jepson Manual Treatment: Festuca rubra
"Tips for Fine Fall Fescue", article at Learn2Grow.com
USDA Plants Profile – Festuca rubra

rubra
Grasses of North America
Grasses of Asia
Grasses of Europe
Native grasses of California
Natural history of the California Coast Ranges
Plants described in 1753
Taxa named by Carl Linnaeus
Garden plants of North America
Drought-tolerant plants
Groundcovers
Lawn grasses